Vietnam's Next Top Model, Cycle 3 is the third season of Vietnam's Next Top Model. The season premiered on August 19, 2012 on VTV3.

Among the prizes was: a 2-year modeling contract with BeU Models worth 1,000,000,000₫ (approximately $50,000), be on the cover in Cosmopolitan magazine along with 200,000,000₫ in cash, a 2-year VIP Diamond Membership card at California Fitness & Yoga Center worth 300,000,000₫. a 1 year gift from Shiseido cosmetic and a short training course in Tokyo sponsored by Shiseido.

The winner of the competition was Mai Thi Giang.

Cao Thi Thien Trang competed in the All-stars season of this series, where she finished 4th/5th place.

Overview

Auditions

Contestants

Episode Summaries

Episode 1 
Original Airdate: August 19, 2012

The judges selected the best 31 contestants from hundreds of girls to step into the journey of becoming Vietnam's Next Top Model.
Advanced to the semi-final: Nguyễn Thị Thuý, Lê Thanh Thảo, Trần Nguyễn Phương Uyên, Huỳnh Thị Linh Ngân, Nguyễn Thị Kiều Ngân, Nguyễn Thị Nhã Trúc, Tôn Nữ Minh Thi, Cao Thị Thiên Trang, Lương Thị Kim Loan, Nguyễn Thị Ngọc Thuý, Hồng Nguyên Phụng, Kha Mỹ Vân, Nguyễn Thị Ngần, Vũ Thị Minh Nguyệt, Vũ Xuân Nhung, Vũ Huyền Trang, Nguyễn Thị Vân, Bùi Thuỳ Dương, Dương Thị Thanh, Đỗ Thu Hà, Lê Thị Thuỳ Trang, Lê Thị Hằng, Mai Thị Giang, Cao Thị Hà, Nguyễn Thị Vinh, Nguyễn Thị Hằng, Trần Thị Hồng Tâm, Nguyễn Thị Hà, Trần Hải Yến, Nguyễn Thị Châm, Nguyễn Thị Ngân.

Episode 2 
Original Airdate: 26 August 2012

Challenge Winner: Nguyễn Thị Ngần, Mai Thị Giang
Withdraw: Nguyễn Thị Ngần
Eliminated: None

Episode 3 
Original Aridate: September 2, 2012Challenge Winner: Mai Giang, Nguyễn Thị Ngân
Featured Designer: Do Manh Cuong
Eliminated: Nguyen Thi Thuy, Tran Nguyen Phuong Quyen, Huynh Thi Linh Ngan, Nguyen Thi Kieu Van, Ton Nu Minh Thi,  Hong Nguyen Phung, Vu Xuan Nhung,  Vu Huyen Trang,  Nguyen Thi Van, Bui Thuy Duong, Le Thi Thuy,  Nguyen Thi Vinh, Tran Thi Hong Tam,  Nguyen Thi Ha, Tran Hai Yen

 Episode 4 Original Airdate: September 9, 2012Challenge Winner: Nha Truc
First Call-out: Mai Giang
Bottom Two: Thu Ha, Nguyen Cham
Eliminated: Nguyen Cham
Featured Photographer: An Le
Featured Designer: Do Manh Cuong

 Episode 5 Original Airdate: September 16, 2012Challenge Winner: Kim Loan
First Call-out: Thanh Thao
Bottom Two: My Van, Nguyen Hang
Eliminated: Nguyen Hang
Featured Designer: Do Manh Cuong

 Episode 6 Original Airdate: September 23, 2012First Call-Out: Thanh Thao
Bottom Two: Kim Loan, Le Hang
Eliminated: Kim Loan
Featured Designer: Do Manh Cuong, Truong Thanh Long

 Episode 7 Original Airdate: September 30, 2012For the weekly photo challenge, the girls were divided into 4 groups and rotate as a girl lead singer and will do the remaining two friends behind, same pose for 1 minute on the band "One Night Only"

First Call-Out: Mai Giang
Bottom Three: Thanh Thao, Le Hang, Cao Ha
Eliminated: Le Hang, Cao Ha
Featured Designer: Kim Khanh, Le Thanh Hoa

 Episode 8 Original Airdate: October 7, 2012First Call-Out: Thanh 
Bottom Two: Thanh Thao, Duong Thanh
Eliminated: Thanh Thao
Featured Designer: Le Kha

 Episode 9 Original Airdate: October 14, 2012First Call-Out: Thiên Trang
Bottom Two: Nhã Trúc, Đỗ Hà
Eliminated: Đỗ Hà
Featured Designer: Mai Lâm, Đỗ Mạnh Cường

 Episode 10 Original Airdate: October 21, 2012First Call-Out: Ngoc Thuy 
Bottom Two: Minh Nguyet, Mai Giang 
Eliminated: Minh Nguyet
Featured Designer: Sabina

 Episode 11 Original Airdate: October 28, 2012First Call-Out: Duong Thanh
Bottom Two: Ngoc Thuy, Nguyen Ngan
Eliminated: Nguyen Ngan
Featured Designer: Rise Above

 Episode 12 Original Airdate: November 4, 2012First Call-Out: Mai Giang
Bottom Two: Thanh Duong, Thien Trang
Eliminated: None
Featured Designer: Kimono

 Episode 13 Original Airdate: November 11, 2012The contestants went to New York for Spring Summer 2013 Fashion Week . No one was eliminated in episode 13.

 Episode 14 Original Airdate: November 18, 2012The episode continued in New York.

Eliminated: Ngoc Thuy, Ngan Nguyen, Nha Truc, Duong Thanh

 Final Original Airdate: November 25, 2012Final three: Mai Giang, Mỹ Vân & Thiên Trang
Eliminated: Thien Trang
Final two: Mỹ Vân & Mai Giang
Vietnam's Next Top Model 2012: Mai Giang

 Summaries 

 Call-out order 

 The contestant was eliminated
 The contestant was originally eliminated from the competition but was saved
 The contestant won the competition

 In episode 3, Ngân was originally eliminated from the competition but was saved.
 In episode 12, Trang was originally eliminated from the competition but was saved.
 In episode 13, No one was eliminated. Ngân was brought back into the competition.
 In episode 14, The photo was Mai Giang's (the only photo was chosen by Cosmopolitan Vietnam and published later on the Cosmopolitan issues on December 2012)

Average  call-out order

 Photo shoot Guide 
Episode 1 Photo Shoot: Promo Shoots (casting)
Episode 2 Photo Shoot: "White Summer" Editorial By The Lake (casting)
Episode 3 Photo Shoot: Futuristic Shots (casting) 
Episode 4 Photo Shoot: Beauty Shots With Cats
Episode 5 Photo Shoot: Good Morning 
Episode 6 Photo Shoot: Editorial With Snakes 
Episode 7 Photo Shoot: Divas Night In Groups
Episode 8 Photo Shoot: Fighters On a Ring
Episode 9 Photo Shoot: Vietnamese Souls 
Episode 10 Photo Shoot: Pin-Up Girls
Episode 11 Photo Shoot: Posing Over The Vietnamese Skyline
Episode 12 Commercial: Shiseido cosmetic in geisha outfit
Episode 13 Photo Shoots: Blowing In New York
Episode 14 Photo Shoot: Photo shoot for Cosmopolitan''
Episode 15 Photo Shoots: Cosmopolitan Cover

Judges 
 Xuân Lan (Host)
 Đinh Nam Trung
 Đỗ Mạnh Cường
 Phạm Hoài Nam

References

External links 
Official Website

Vietnam's Next Top Model
2010s Vietnamese television series
2012 Vietnamese television seasons